is a former Japanese football player. He played for Japan national team.

Club career
Michiki was born in Nagasaki Prefecture on 25 August 1973. After graduating from high school, he joined Sanfrecce Hiroshima in 1992. He mainly played as left side-back. The club won the 2nd place at 1995 and 1996 Emperor's Cup. Although he moved to Yokohama Marinos (later Yokohama F. Marinos) in 1998, his opportunity to play decreased. He moved to Urawa Reds in 1999. In 2003, although he moved to Vissel Kobe in January, he resigned in February. Although he signed with Oita Trinita in April, he resigned in June.

National team career
In July 1996, Michiki was selected Japan U-23 national team for 1996 Summer Olympics and he played in all matches. In first match against Brazil U-23 national team, he assisted Teruyoshi Ito's goal and Japan won Brazil (1-0). It was known as "Miracle of Miami" (マイアミの奇跡) in Japan.

On 13 October 1996, he debuted for Japan national team against Tunisia. He was selected Japan for 1996 Asian Cup in December, but he did not play in the match. He played 4 games for Japan until 1997.

Club statistics

National team statistics

National team
 1996 Asian Cup

References

External links

 
 Japan National Football Team Database
 

1973 births
Living people
Association football people from Nagasaki Prefecture
Japanese footballers
Japan international footballers
J1 League players
J2 League players
Sanfrecce Hiroshima players
Yokohama F. Marinos players
Urawa Red Diamonds players
Vissel Kobe players
Oita Trinita players
1996 AFC Asian Cup players
Footballers at the 1996 Summer Olympics
Olympic footballers of Japan
Association football defenders
Association football midfielders